Ri Sang-chol (born 26 December 1990) is a North Korean professional footballer who plays as a midfielder.

International goals
.Scores and results are list North Korea's goal tally first.

References

External links 
 
 Ri Sang-chol at DPRKFootball

1990 births
Living people
North Korean footballers
North Korea international footballers
Association football midfielders
2015 AFC Asian Cup players